Stadion Lokomotiv is a multi-purpose stadium, located in Sofia, Bulgaria. The stadium holds 22,000 people, of which 17,500 are seating. The stadium was built in 1985.

It is currently used mostly for football matches and is the home ground of Lokomotiv Sofia.

Also, from 2000, the stadium is used for major rock concerts.

Concerts
 Black Sabbath, 2005
 Depeche Mode, 2006
 Eros Ramazzotti, 2006
 George Michael, 28 May 2007, 25 LIVE tour
 Iron Maiden, 4 June 2007
 Kylie Minogue, 18 May 2008
 Elton John, 13 June 2010 35,000
 Depeche Mode, 12 May 2013
 Aerosmith, 17 May 2014
 Lady Gaga, 28 May 2023
P!nk was scheduled to perform at the stadium during her I'm Not Dead Tour on July 1, 2007, but she cancelled the show due to illness.

Gallery

References

External links
  Lokomotiv Stadium/стадион Локомотив

Football venues in Bulgaria
Sports venues in Sofia
Multi-purpose stadiums in Bulgaria
Music venues in Bulgaria